SPANX family member B1 is a protein that in humans is encoded by the SPANXB1 gene.

Function

Temporally regulated transcription and translation of several testis-specific genes is required to initiate the series of molecular and morphological changes in the male germ cell lineage necessary for the formation of mature spermatozoa. This gene is a member of the SPANX family of cancer/testis-associated genes, which are located in a cluster on chromosome X. The SPANX genes encode deferentially expressed testis-specific proteins that localize to various subcellular compartments. This particular family member contains an additional 18 nucleotides in its coding region compared to the other family members in the same gene cluster. This family member is also subject to gene copy number variation. Although the protein encoded by this gene contains consensus nuclear localization signals, the major site for subcellular localization of expressed protein is in the cytoplasmic droplets of ejaculated spermatozoa. This protein provides a biochemical marker for studying the unique structures in spermatozoa, while attempting to further define its role in spermatogenesis. [provided by RefSeq, Apr 2014].

References

Further reading